National Route 261 is a national highway of Japan connecting Naka-ku, Hiroshima and Gōtsu, Shimane in Japan, with a total length of 102.2 km (63.5 mi).

References

National highways in Japan
Roads in Hiroshima Prefecture
Roads in Shimane Prefecture